Mueang Det is a capital tambon (subdistrict) of Det Udom District, in Ubon Ratchathani Province, Thailand. In 2021, it had a population of 33,447 people. Neighbouring subdistricts are (clockwise from the south) Tha Pho Si, Na Charoen, Na Rueang, Kut Prathai, Phon Ngam and Klang.

History
The region was settled in the early 1800s, the first village was named Dom Yai village. The conflict between the governor of Sisaket, Phraya Viset Bhakdee (พระยาวิเศษภักดี), and three royal nobilities, including Luang Thibet (หลวงธิเบศร์), Luang Mahatthai (หลวงมหาดไทย), and Luang Abhai (หลวงอภัย) caused those three clans with members of 2,150 people to evacuate to Dom Yai village in 1845 and the village was promoted to the town named "Det Udom", under the control of the city of Khukhan.

In 1892, the town gained subdistrict status and was considered the capital of the former district, Prajim Det Udom (ปจิมเดชอุดม; Western Det Udom), which was later merged with other three districts; Matchim Det Udom" (มัชฌิมเดชุอดม; Central Det Udom), Uthai Det Udom (อุทัยเดชอุดม; Eastern Det Udom), and Dom Pradit (โดมประดิษฐ์), to create a new district, Det Udom district in 1912. While the Muaeng Det subdistrict is much older, the Sukhaphiban Mueang Det (สุขาภิบาลเมืองเดช) as the local administration unit was established in 1956. Effective 1999, it was upgraded to a subdistrict municipality, and then to a town municipality in 2007.

In 1924, due to the repeated floods, the city center was moved from Muaeng Khao village (บ้านเมืองเก่า; Village of the Old City) to the current city government center, Non Khampom (โนนขามป้อม; the mound of Malacca tree).

Some regions of the tambon were cut off to establish new subdistricts several times including Kut Prathai in 1947, Na Charoen in 1966, Tha Pho Si in 1976, Na Rueang in 1977, and Phon Ngam in 1986.

Geography
The tambon was located in the central region of the Det Udom district, which is the low river plain of the Lam Dom Yai river, and covered 30 kilometers of squares.

Administration
The tambon is divided into 34 administrative villages (mubans; หมู่บ้าน), one of them, Som Sa-ard village, was further divided into two community groups (Mu; หมู่). The area is shared by 2 local governments; the township area was administrated by the Det Udom Town Municipality (เทศบาลเมืองเดชอุดม) while the remaining was covered by the Subdistrict Administrative Organization of Mueang Det (องค์การบริหารส่วนตำบลเมืองเดช; Mueang Det SAO).

The following is a list of the subdistrict's mubans, which roughly correspond to the villages, as of the 2021 census.

References

Tambon of Ubon Ratchathani Province